Soul Detective (Chinese: 灵探) is a Singaporean supernatural drama series produced and telecast on Mediacorp Channel 8. It stars James Seah, Bryan Wong, Jesseca Liu, Carrie Wong, Cavin Soh, Nick Teo, Guo Liang, Priscelia Chan and Jeremy Chan.

Cast

Main
James Seah as Peh Ye
Bryan Wong as Ang Zhe Ren
Jesseca Liu as Liu Shu Qin
Carrie Wong as Ang Jieshan
Cavin Soh
Nick Teo
Guo Liang as Peh Ching Keong
Priscelia Chan
Jeremy Chan as Feng kang Kai

Recurring
Phyllis Quek as Yu Jiachun
Cheryl Chou
Xuan Ong
Sam Chong
Teo Boon Seong

References

2020s Singaporean television series
2022 Singaporean television series debuts
Mediacorp Chinese language programmes